Baja California is a state in Northwest Mexico that is divided into seven municipalities. According to the 2020 Mexican Census, Baja California is the 13th most populous state with  inhabitants and the 12th largest by land area spanning .

Municipalities in Baja California are administratively autonomous of the state according to the 115th article of the 1917 Constitution of Mexico. Their legal framework derives from Title VI of the state Constitution and the state's 2001 Law of the Municipal Regime. Every three years, citizens elect a municipal president (Spanish: presidente municipal) by a plurality voting system who heads a concurrently elected municipal council (ayuntamiento) responsible for providing public services for their constituents. The municipal council consists of a variable number of trustees and councillors (regidores y síndicos) who govern from the municipal seat. Municipalities are responsible for public services (such as water and sewerage), street lighting, public safety, traffic, and the maintenance of public parks, gardens and cemeteries. They may also assist the state and federal governments in education, emergency fire and medical services, environmental protection and maintenance of monuments and historical landmarks. Since 1984, they have had the power to collect property taxes and user fees, although more funds are obtained from the state and federal governments than from their own income. Municipalities may establish functional and geographical subdivisions called delegaciones and subdelegaciones in accordance with Article 29 of the Law of the Municipal Regime.

The largest municipality by population in Baja California and in Mexico is Tijuana with 1,922,523 residents, representing around half of the population of the state. The smallest municipality by population is San Felipe: the areas which now make up San Felipe recorded a population of 18,369 inhabitants in the 2010 Mexican Census. San Quintín, which spans , is the largest municipality by area in the state and in the country. Playas de Rosarito is the smallest municipality by area spanning .

Municipalities 

The following figures do not take into account the creation of San Felipe in 2022, for which current area and population figures from INEGI are not yet available.

Notes

References

 
Baja California